Pages River, a perennial river of the Hunter River catchment, is located in the Hunter region of New South Wales, Australia.

Course and features
The Pages River rises on the eastern slopes of the Great Dividing Range below Mount Gregson, southwest of Murrurundi, and flows generally east northeast, then southeast, and then south southwest before reaching its confluence with the Hunter River downstream of Glenbawn Dam. The river descends  over its  course.

See also

 Rivers of New South Wales
 List of rivers of Australia
 List of rivers of New South Wales (L–Z)

References

External links
 

Muswellbrook Shire
Rivers of the Hunter Region
Hunter River (New South Wales)